opened in Tokushima, Japan, in 1998. The collection includes artefacts from the Jōmon to the Nara and Heian periods.

See also
 Tokushima Prefectural Museum
 Tokushima Prefectural Buried Cultural Properties Research Centre
 List of Cultural Properties of Japan - archaeological materials (Tokushima)

References

External links
  Tokushima Archaeological Museum

Museums in Tokushima Prefecture
Tokushima (city)
Archaeological museums in Japan
Museums established in 1998
1998 establishments in Japan